The Amer is a river in the Dutch province of North Brabant. The Amer is a major navigation route. It forms the south boundary of the Biesbosch National Park.

The river is also known because the Amercentrale, one of the biggest power plants in the Netherlands, is located on its bank. As a result, ships transporting coal for the plant use the eastern part of the river, mainly coming from the Wilhelmina Canal.

Rivers of North Brabant
Rivers of the Rhine–Meuse–Scheldt delta
Rivers of the Netherlands
0Amer
Geography of Altena, North Brabant
Drimmelen
Geertruidenberg